Quatro Ribeiras is a civil parish in the municipality of Praia da Vitoria on the northern coast of the Portuguese island of Terceira in the Azores. The population in 2011 was 394, in an area of 12.83 km². It is the least populous parish in the municipality. It contains the localities Boqueiro, Canada do Cruzeiro, Canada do Saco, Canada do Velho, Farroco, Quatro Ribeiras and Rebentão do Bom Jesus.

Situated on a rocky massif by seaside, this locality is crossed by four streams - Ribeira Grande, Ribeira Pequena, Ribeira Seca and Ribeira do Almeida -, thus the name Quatro Ribeiras.

History 

According to the chronicles, it was one of the first settlements of the island. Built in devotion to Santa Beatriz, one of the first churches of the island was built here in the fifteenth century.

Natural Heritage 
 Gruta das Pombas
 Baía das Quatro Ribeiras
 Costa das Quatro Ribeiras
 Pico dos Loiros
 Zona Balnear das Quatro Ribeiras

Architectural Heritage 
 Chafariz do Cruzeiro
 Igreja de Santa Beatriz
 Império do Espírito Santo de Quatro Ribeiras
 Miradouro da Rocha Alta
 Miradouro dos Moinhos

References

Freguesias of Praia da Vitória